Wuhan Tianhe International Airport  is an airport serving Wuhan, the capital of the Hubei province, China. It was opened on 15 April 1995, replacing the old Hankou Wangjiadun Airport and Nanhu Airport as the major airport of Wuhan.

It is the busiest airport in central China as it is geographically located in the centre of China's airline route network. The airport served 20,772,000 passengers in 2016, making it the 14th busiest airport by passenger traffic in China. The airport is a focus city for Air China, China Eastern Airlines, and China Southern Airlines. The airport has flights to international destinations such as New York City, San Francisco, Tokyo, Rome, Istanbul, Dubai, Sydney, Bali, Bangkok, Moscow, Osaka, Seoul, and Singapore. The name Tianhe can be literally translated as "Sky River"; Tianhe is also one of the names for the Milky Way in ancient Chinese.

Since 2019, passengers from 53 countries such as the EU countries, Japan, South Korea, Russia, the U.S., when transiting to a third country, can enter China from this airport without a Chinese visa for up to 144 hours.

On 23 January 2020, the airport was closed due to the 2020 Hubei lockdowns in response to the COVID-19 pandemic, where the first outbreak happened in Wuhan. The airport reopened on 8 April 2020 following a large-scale disinfection.

History 
To replace the old Wangjiadun Airport and the larger, international Nanhu Airport, the Chinese government permitted plans to build a commercial airport in Tianhe Town, Huangpi District, Wuhan on 1 July 1985. The first term construction started in December 1989 and finished in April 1994. It initially operated domestic flights but later in 2000, the CAA re-designated it as an international airport.

Nanhu Airport was the main airport of Wuhan before 1995. Although built in 1936 as a military airport and 1951 as a civil airport, it was located near the city center, and by 1994, air traffic had climaxed and the airport was too small to handle larger amount of passengers. The first international flight from and to Wuhan only started on   Halloween 1992, when Wuhan-Vientiane route was opened.

The airport was opened on 15 April 1995, and the old Nanhu Airport is closed in the same time. Any passengers still waiting at Nanhu Airport were immediately taken by bus to the new Tianhe Airport. Wangjiadun Airport still opened by that time, but mainly for military operations, then closed and demolished in 2007.

The airport has expanded twice – first for terminal 2 and second for terminal 3, new control tower and the second runway.

Wuhan opened up to intercontinental flights when Air France began service from Paris on 11 April 2012, and two years later opened up to the United States non-stop when China Southern Airlines announced, in September 2014, a daily non-stop flight to San Francisco, originating from Guangzhou, operating with a Boeing 787 to begin 16 December 2014.

Facilities

Runways
Tianhe International Airport has two runways.

Runway West (04L 22R)
Length: , width:

Runway East (04R 22L main runway)
Length: , width:

ILS
Tianhe Airport equipped with ILS II in south side (main landing side), ILS I in north side. The East runway is equipped with blind landing systems.

Terminals

Terminal 1 (demolished)
Terminal 1 was opened in 1995 when all flight services were transferred from Nanhu Airport to Tianhe International Airport. It was located at where the west concourse of Terminal 3 stands nowadays. It had been the only terminal of the airport until Terminal 2 was completed in 2008.

From 2008 onwards, all domestic flights were operated at T2 while international flights were still operated at T1. T1 was closed in 2010 after serving international flights for two years. A new international terminal was built in 2010, and has undergone subsequent expansions after seeing major increase of international travelers. The terminal was demolished during the construction of Terminal 3.

Terminal 2 (closed)
Terminal 2 was the main terminal for Tianhe Airport during 2008–2017, which handled only domestic airlines. It has a floor area of 121,200 square meters and a designed capacity to handle 13 million passengers and 320,000 tons of cargo a year. The project was completed on 15 April 2008, at a total cost of 3.37 billion yuan (421.5 million US dollars). By 2010, Wuhan served at least 5 international and 100 domestic routes. The airport's cargo-handling capacity is to reach 144,000 tons.
 
Terminal 2 was closed when Terminal 3 were officially opened in mid 2017 for the upgrade construction.

International Terminal (closed)

The International Terminal was opened in December 2010 and all international flights and flights to Hong Kong, Macau and Taiwan operated at the International Terminal from 2010 to 2017. After the old Terminal 1 was closed in 2010, the International Terminal was sometimes mistakenly called "T1" by passengers.

The single-floor terminal is located at the southwest of Terminal 2. It has a floor area of 5310 square meters, shared by both departure and arrival facilities. To handle wide-body jet within limited ramp, there is no air-bridge for this terminal.

Due to its compact size and the growing number of international flights, there were complaints that Terminal 1 was "too crowded". In 2013, the average departure traffic was 880 per hour during the peak season, which was far greater than its designed maximum capacity of 550.

The International Terminal was closed in mid 2017 and it will be turned to a chartered and VIP terminal in the future.

Terminal 3
Starting from 31 August 2017, all flights from the original International Terminal (international, Hong Kong, Macau and Taiwan) and T2 (domestic) have been moved to Terminal 3, which has a passenger capacity of 35 million. Following the opening of the new Terminal 3, International Terminal (IT) and Terminal 2 (T2) were closed temporarily for renovation. IT is scheduled to operate as the VIP terminal. T2 will undergo renovation and reopen when passengers in T3 exceed the design limit.

The T3 has a new departure lounge, restaurants and duty-free shops.

The construction of Terminal 3 started in June 2013 and it was opened on 31 August 2017. A new runway, new control tower, and a transportation hub connecting the airport to the city with an intercity railway and a metro line have been built and opened along with the new terminal.

Airlines and destinations

Passenger

Cargo

Gallery

Transportation

Roads 
Two tolled expressways, the S18 Wuhan Airport Expressway and the S19 Wuhan Airport 2nd Expressway, connect the airport to downtown Hankou.

Public Transit 
There is a limited bus service between Wuhan Tianhe Airport and several bus stops in the urban area of Wuhan.

The Wuhan–Xiaogan intercity railway, one of the lines of the Wuhan Metropolitan Area intercity railway, serves Wuhan Tianhe Airport. This railway opened in December 2016.

The extension of Line 2 of Wuhan Metro to Tianhe International Airport station opened on 28 December 2016.

Future development
According to the 2019-2025 development plan by Hubei Provincial Development and Reform Commission, the fourth terminal, a new satellite terminal and a third runway will be built.

Presently, Tianhe is the only civic airport in the Wuhan metropolitan area. However, the city authorities are considering repurposing the military Shanpo Airfield (山坡机场), located in the city's far southern suburbs (Shanpo Township, Jiangxia District), as a commercial cargo airport. If the plans are implemented, Shanpo will become Wuhan's second airport.

References

External links

Wuhan Tianhe International Airport Official website 

Airports in Hubei
Transport in Wuhan
Airfields of the United States Army Air Forces in China
Airports established in 1995
1995 establishments in China